James Humphreys (10 February 1894 – 23 December 1956) was an Irish hurler who played as a midfielder for the Limerick senior team.

Humphreys was a regular member of the starting fifteen for over a decade from the 1910s until the 1920s.  During that time he won two All-Ireland medals and three Munster medals. He was also captain of the Ireland team during the 1924 Tailteann Games.

At club level Humphreys played with both Cappamore and Claughaun, winning a county championship medal with the latter.

References

1894 births
1956 deaths
Cappamore hurlers
Claughaun hurlers
Limerick inter-county hurlers
All-Ireland Senior Hurling Championship winners